Burn is an energy drink owned and distributed by Monster Beverage Corporation, carrying the official tagline "Fuel your fire". Burn is distributed in more than 80 countries.

Ingredients 

Acidity regulator (Citric acid, Natrium citrate)
Antioxidants (Ascorbic acid)
Arginine
Aromas (Theobromine)
B Vitamins
Caffeine
Carbonated water
Food coloring (E163, E150d)
Ginseng
Guarana
Maltodextrin
Preservative (E202)
Sugar
Taurine
Water

Caffeine content 
Caffeine content per 100 ml is 32 mg.

Nutritional values per 100 ml

Flavors 
Original
Apple Kiwi
Zero Sugar
Passion Punch
Lemon Ice
Dark Energy
Sour Twist
Cherry
Mango
Raspberry Zero Sugar
Peach Zero Sugar

References 

Energy drinks